Maurizio Serra (born 3 June 1955 in London) is a contemporary Italian writer and diplomat. Maurizio Serra was Italian Ambassador to the Unesco. He writes in Italian and French. He was elected to the Académie Française on 9 January 2020. 

His father was Enrico Serra, Italian historian.

Works 
1999: Le Passager du siècle. Guerres, révolutions, Europes, with Ferenc Fejtő, Paris, Éditions Hachette, 373 p. 
2008: Les Frères séparés. Drieu La Rochelle, Aragon, Malraux face à l'histoire , ["Fratelli separati : Drieu-Aragon-Malraux : il fascista, il comunista, l'avventuriero"], trans. Carole Cavallera, Paris, La Table Ronde, 319 p. 
2008: – prix du Rayonnement de la langue et de la littérature françaises (Académie française)
2008: Marinetti et la révolution futuriste, trad. de Carole Cavallera, Paris, Éditions de L’Herne, series "Carnets de l'Herne", 115 p. 
2011: Malaparte, vies et légendes, Paris, Éditions Grasset et Fasquelle, 634 p. 
2011: – Prix Goncourt de la Biographie.
2011: – prix Casanova
2012: Malaparte, vies et légendes, édition revue et augmentée, Paris, Éditions Perrin, series "Tempus", 797 p. 
2013: Italo Svevo ou l’antivie, Paris, Éditions Grasset et Fasquelle, 400 p. 
2015: Une génération perdue. Les Poètes-guerriers dans l'Europe des années 1930, Paris, Éditions du Seuil, 360 p. 
2015: L’esteta armato. Il Poeta-Condottiero nell’Europa degli anni Trenta, Lavis, La Finestra Editrice, 404 p. []

References

External links 
 Maurizio Serra: futurisme, fascisme, communisme on Causeur.fr 
 Une génération perdue de Maurizio Serra 
 Publications de Maurizio Serra on CAIRN 
 "Malaparte, vies et légendes", de Maurizio Serra : Malaparte, "génial et dégueulasse", Le Monde, 23 June 2011 

1955 births
Living people
21st-century Italian writers
21st-century Italian male writers
Italian expatriates in France
Italian writers in French
Italian essayists
Male essayists
Members of the Académie Française
Prix Goncourt de la Biographie winners
Writers from London
Italian male non-fiction writers